Kristján Harðarson (born 28 July 1964) is an Icelandic former athlete. He competed in the men's long jump at the 1984 Summer Olympics.

References

1964 births
Living people
Athletes (track and field) at the 1984 Summer Olympics
Kristjan Hardarson
Kristjan Hardarson
Place of birth missing (living people)